The Academy of State Customs Committee of the Republic of Azerbaijan is a higher educational institution. It implements fundamental and applied research while providing higher and supplementary educational programs. The Academy was established to prepare qualified personnel for the State Customs Committee of the Republic, increase the qualifications of employees, and conduct scientific research in the field of customs. The Academy Head is Qulu Novruzov, who began on 31 October 2018.

History 
The Academy was established by the Decree of the President of the Republic dated January 24, 2012. On July 8, 2013, the Statute of the Academy was adopted by Decree No. 939 of the President of Azerbaijan.

Faculties 
The “Organization of Works of Custom” faculty was set up on the basis of Order of 100/048 of the State Customs Committee of Azerbaijan. The faculty is a scientific and administrative unit of the State Customs Academy. The Academy offers undergraduate and postgraduate teaching. During the 2014/2015 academic year, there were only two specialties: Law and Economics.

The standard period of study at the academy at the bachelor's level on a full-time basis is four years.

The expenses for additional education of customs officers are covered by the extra-budgetary fund for the development of the customs system in accordance with "Regulations on the Non-budgetary Fund for the Development of the Customs System of the Republic of Azerbaijan and the rules for spending the means of the Fund", approved by Cabinet of Ministers of Azerbaijan.

Currently, the two majors in the faculty are Economy and Law.

Departments 
Economics and Natural Sciences
Law and Humanities
Information security
International trade and logistics

Cooperation 
On May 21, 2021, a memorandum of cooperation was signed between the Academy of the State Customs Committee and the scientific center of the Prosecutor General's Office of Azerbaijan.

References

External links 

 Academy of State Customs Committee of the Republic of Azerbaijan

Universities in Baku
Science and technology in Azerbaijan
Educational institutions established in 2012
2012 establishments in Azerbaijan